Pseudodaphnella rottnestensis is a species of sea snail, a marine gastropod mollusk in the family Raphitomidae.

Description

Distribution
This marine species occurs off Western Australia.

References

 Cotton, Bernard C. Australian Recent and Tertiary Turridae. Field Naturalists' Section of the Royal Society of South Australia, Conchology Club, 1947.

External links
 

rottnestensis
Gastropods described in 1947
Gastropods of Australia